The Pickands–Balkema–De Haan theorem gives the asymptotic tail distribution of a random variable, when its true distribution is unknown. It is often called the second theorem in extreme value theory. Unlike the first theorem (the Fisher–Tippett–Gnedenko theorem), which concerns the maximum of a sample, the Pickands–Balkema–De Haan theorem describes the values above a threshold.

The theorem owes its name to mathematicians James Pickands, Guus Balkema, and Laurens de Haan.

Conditional excess distribution function
This is the so-called conditional excess distribution function, defined as

 

The function  describes the distribution of the excess value over a threshold , given that the threshold is exceeded.

Statement
Let  be a sequence of independent and identically-distributed random variables, and let  be their conditional excess distribution function. Pickands, Balkema and De Haan posed that for a large class of underlying distribution functions , and large ,  is well approximated by the generalized Pareto distribution. That is:

 

where
,  if 
,  if 

Here σ > 0, and y ≥ 0 when k ≥ 0 and 0 ≤ y ≤ −σ/k when k < 0. These special cases are also known as  

Exponential distribution with mean ,  if k = 0,
 Pareto distribution, if k > 0.

Since a special case of the generalized Pareto distribution is a power-law, the Pickands–Balkema–De Haan theorem is sometimes used to justify the use of a power-law for modeling extreme events.

The theorem has been extended to include a wider range of distributions. While the extended versions cover, for example the normal and log-normal distributions, still continuous distributions exist that are not covered.

See also 

 Stable distribution

References 

Probability theorems
Extreme value data
Tails of probability distributions